Graeme Ferguson (born 17 June 1952) is a British biathlete. He competed at the 1976 Winter Olympics, the 1980 Winter Olympics and the 1984 Winter Olympics.

References

1952 births
Living people
British male biathletes
Olympic biathletes of Great Britain
Biathletes at the 1976 Winter Olympics
Biathletes at the 1980 Winter Olympics
Biathletes at the 1984 Winter Olympics
Sportspeople from Kirkcaldy